Gateway Films is an independent London based production company, specialising in crime and youth films. It was officially established in 2009 by actor Terry Stone, in collaboration with Terry Byrne, Chris Howard.

In 2010, the company launched Gateway Animation Studio, by Stuart william which is the first animation studio in Great Britain dedicated to producing CGI feature length films and children's 3D animations.

In 2011 Gateway Films collaborated with Bhatt Entertainment and started filming worldwide.

Productions
Rise of the Footsoldier (2007)
Doghouse (2009)
Shank (2010)
Bonded by Blood (2010)
Anuvahood (2011)
The Holding (2011)
Sket (2011)
Outside Bet (2012)
Get Lucky (2013)
Saving Santa (2013)
Plastic (2013)
Messenger (2014)
Away (2016)
Once Upon a Time in London (2017)
O2 (2019)

References

External links 
 Official site

2009 establishments in the United Kingdom
Mass media companies established in 2009
Film production companies of the United Kingdom
British animation studios
Non-theatrical film production companies
Mass media companies based in London